Dolnje Ležeče is a settlement next to Divača in the Littoral region of Slovenia.

The local church is dedicated to the Holy Trinity and belongs to the Parish of Divača.

References

External links

Dolnje Ležeče on Geopedia

Populated places in the Municipality of Divača